Pinjala Ananda Rao was an Indian film producer known for his work in Telugu cinema. He has mostly produced and distributed mythological and folklore films under the production house Ananda Lakshmi Art Movies. In 1976, he produced Seeta Kalyanam was screened at the BFI London Film Festival, Chicago International Film Festival

Selected filmography
Seeta Kalyanam
Lakshmi Pooja
Maha Shakthi
Vikramarka Vijayam
Jaganmohini

References

Telugu film producers
Film producers from Andhra Pradesh